Greene County is a county located in the east central portion of the U.S. state of Georgia. As of the 2020 census, the population was 18,915. The county seat is Greensboro. The county was created on February 3, 1786, and is named for Nathanael Greene, an American Revolutionary War major general.

History
Greene County was formed on February 3, 1786, from land given by Washington County. It was named in honor of General Nathanael Greene, a hero of the American Revolutionary War.

Geography 

The majority of Greene County, west of a line between Woodville, Union Point, and White Plains, is located in the Upper Oconee River sub-basin of the Altamaha River basin.  The northern half of the remainder of the county is located in the Little River sub-basin of the Savannah River basin, while the southern half is located in the Upper Ogeechee River sub-basin of the Ogeechee River basin.

Major highways 
  Interstate 20
  U.S. Route 278
  State Route 12
  State Route 15
  State Route 44
  State Route 77
 State Route 402 (unsigned designation for I-20)

Adjacent counties 
 Oglethorpe County (north)
 Taliaferro County (east)
 Hancock County (southeast)
 Putnam County (southwest)
 Morgan County (west)
 Oconee County (northwest)

National protected area 
 Oconee National Forest (part)

Demographics

2000 census
At the 2000 census, there were 14,406 people, 5,477 households and 4,042 families living in the county. The population density was 37 per square mile (14/km2). There were 6,653 housing units at an average density of 17 per square mile (7/km2). The racial makeup of the county was 52.95% White, 44.45% Black or African American, 0.25% Native American, 0.25% Asian, 0.06% Pacific Islander, 1.49% from other races, and 0.56% from two or more races.  2.92% of the population were Hispanic or Latino of any race.

There were 5,477 households, of which 29.20% had children under the age of 18 living with them, 51.00% were married couples living together, 18.30% had a female householder with no husband present, and 26.20% were non-families. 23.00% of all households were made up of individuals, and 10.10% had someone living alone who was 65 years of age or older. The average household size was 2.59 and the average family size was 3.02.

25.10% of the population were under the age of 18, 8.70% from 18 to 24, 24.30% from 25 to 44, 27.50% from 45 to 64, and 14.40% who were 65 years of age or older. The median age was 39 years. For every 100 females there were 91.90 males. For every 100 females age 18 and over, there were 88.50 males.

The median household income was $33,479 and the median family incomewas $39,794. Males had a median income of $31,295 versus $20,232 for females. The per capita income for the county was $23,389. About 16.00% of families and 22.30% of the population were below the poverty line, including 33.80% of those under age 18 and 20.20% of those age 65 or over.

2010 census
As of the 2010 United States Census, there were 15,994 people, 6,519 households, and 4,677 families living in the county. The racial makeup of the county was 56.6% white, 38.2% black or African American, 0.3% Asian, 0.3% American Indian, 0.1% Pacific islander, 3.4% from other races, and 1.1% from two or more races. Those of Hispanic or Latino origin made up 5.6% of the population. In terms of ancestry, 21.1% were American, 7.6% were English, and 6.1% were German.

Of the 6,519 households, 26.7% had children under the age of 18 living with them, 51.4% were married couples living together, 15.8% had a female householder with no husband present, 28.3% were non-families, and 25.0% of all households were made up of individuals. The average household size was 2.43 and the average family size was 2.85. The median age was 46.4 years.

The median income for a household in the county was $38,513 and the median income for a family was $42,307. Males had a median income of $32,245 versus $24,622 for females. The per capita income for the county was $24,943. About 17.8% of families and 23.6% of the population were below the poverty line, including 39.0% of those under age 18 and 15.6% of those age 65 or over.

2020 census

As of the 2020 United States census, there were 18,915 people, 7,132 households, and 4,975 families residing in the county.

Education
The county supports the Greene County School Board, Lake Oconee Academy and Nathanael Greene Academy.

Role in passage of the Georgia Indigent Defense Act 
In 2001, Georgia Supreme Court Chief Justice Robert Benham convened a committee to investigate indigent defense in the state of Georgia. An avalanche of complaints about the state of public defense in Greene County, along with a number of lawsuits filed by Stephen Bright and the Southern Center for Human Rights, contributed to the formation of this commission. The commission discovered during its investigation that indigent defendants in Greene County were routinely pleaded guilty by judges without the presence of counsel and sometimes without even being present in court to make their pleas, violations of the Sixth Amendment. Excessive bail, e.g. $50,000 for loitering, was often set as well, a violation of the Eighth Amendment. After two years of investigation, the committee's recommendations led to the passage of the Georgia Indigent Defense Act.

Communities
 Greensboro
 Scull Shoals, an extinct town on the Chattahoochee River.
 Siloam
 Union Point
 White Plains
 Woodville

Politics
Prior to 2000, the only time Greene County failed to back a Democratic Party candidate in a presidential election was in 1972, when Richard Nixon won every county in Georgia and all but 130 counties nationwide. From 2000 onward, it has been consistently Republican.

See also

 National Register of Historic Places listings in Greene County, Georgia
List of counties in Georgia

References

External links
 Greene County historical marker
 Old Greene County "Gaol" historical marker

 
Georgia (U.S. state) counties
1786 establishments in Georgia (U.S. state)
Populated places established in 1786